Aono (written: 青野) is a Japanese surname. Notable people with the surname include:

Daisuke Aono (born 1979), Japanese football player
Joanne Aono, Japanese American artist
Ryō Aono (born 1990), Japanese snowboarder
So Aono (born 1943), Japanese novelist
Taka Aono, Japanese drift driver
Takeshi Aono (1936–2012), Japanese voice actor and actor
Takeshi Aono (baseball) (born 1983), Japanese professional baseball infielder
Teruichi Aono (born 1953), Japanese professional 9-dan shogi professional who has written a number of shogi learning materials that were translated in English

Fictional characters
 Miki Aono, a character in Fresh Pretty Cure!

Japanese-language surnames